Mark Symington Geston (born June 20, 1946) is an American science fiction and fantasy author.

Biography and writing career
Mark Geston was born in Atlantic City, New Jersey. Both of his parents were teachers, his mother of English and Journalism as well as writing book reviews. He graduated from Abington High School. None of the stories he wrote while growing up in Philadelphia or in high school were published, but when he was 19 and in his second year of college he began writing Lords of the Starship, which was published in 1967. He graduated from Kenyon College in Ohio with a degree in history in 1968, received a J.D. degree from New York University Law School in 1971 and had published three more novels by 1976.

Lords of the Starship takes place on Earth some 3000 years after the collapse of human technological civilization, narrating generations of history inspired by an immense starship construction project. Out of the Mouth of the Dragon take place in the same world as some in it continue to struggle with its decline and hopelessness. The Day Star further explores decay, time, and aspiration as a boy and a ghost seek a more glorious world. The Siege of Wonder describes the ending of a centuries-long war between magic and technology, in the experience of a man who has entered the magicians' domain as a spy.

Geston is a full-time attorney. His fifth novel, Mirror to the Sky, is set in a near future world reacting emotionally and culturally to works of art brought to Earth by aliens.

Published works
 Lords of the Starship, novel, Ace Books, 1967, 156 pp.
 First hardcover edition: London, Michael Joseph, 1971, 158 pp. 
 Out of the Mouth of the Dragon, novel, Ace Books, 1969, 156 pp.
 First hardcover edition: London, Michael Joseph, 1969, 156 pp. 
 The Day Star, novel,  DAW Books, 1972, 126 pp.
 "The Stronghold", short story, Fantastic, July 1974
 The Siege of Wonder, novel, Doubleday, 1976, 180 pp. 
 First paperback edition: DAW Books, 1977, 190 pp. 
 Mirror to the Sky, novel, Morrow/AvoNova, 1992, 234 pp. 
 "Falconer", short story, Amazing Stories, May 1993
 "The Allies", novelette, The Magazine of Fantasy & Science Fiction, May 1998
 The Book of the Wars, omnibus edition of Lords of the Starship, Out of the Mouth of the Dragon, and The Siege of Wonder, Baen Books, 2009, 646 pp.

References
Thomas F. Monteleone. Introduction, Lords of the Starship, Boston, Gregg Press, 1978, p. v
Donald H. Tuck. The Encyclopedia of Fantasy and Science Fiction, Volume 1: Who's Who, A-L, Chicago, Advent, 1974, p. 185.
R. Reginald. Science Fiction and Fantasy Literature: A Checklist, 1700-1974 with Contemporary Science Fiction Authors II, Volume 2, Detroit, Gale Research Company, p. 912.

External links

Review of The Siege of Wonder

1946 births
Living people
20th-century American novelists
American fantasy writers
American male novelists
American science fiction writers
Kenyon College alumni
American male short story writers
20th-century American short story writers
20th-century American male writers